Bestemødre mot atomvåpen ("Grandmothers Against Nuclear Arms") was a Norwegian anti-nuclear organisation, founded in Oslo in 1983. Each Wednesday during the school term, they demonstrated against nuclear arms at the square Stortings plass in Oslo. The organisation was dissolved in September 2003.

The organisation was inspired by the Mothers of the Plaza de Mayo.

Literature
Randi Aas: Bestemødrene på Stortings plass, Emilia forlag, 2006

Anti–nuclear weapons movement
Norwegian anti–nuclear weapons activists
Organizations established in 1983
Organizations disestablished in 2003
Organisations based in Oslo